456 may refer to:

The year 456 AD
The year 456 BC
The year 456 AH in the Islamic calendar
The British Rail Class 456 electric multiple unit
The Ferrari 456 road car
Seong Gi-hun of Squid Game
The 4, 5, 6 IRT Lexington Avenue Line
The 456, a race of aliens in the BBC science fiction series Torchwood
456 (album), a 1992 album by The Grid
4,5,6, a 1995 album by Kool G Rap
"4, 5, 6", a 1999 song by Solé
Cee-lo, a dice game also known as Four-Five-Six